Rutas de la vida (Routes of the Life) is a Mexican drama anthology series produced by Rafael Uriostegui for TV Azteca, being an original story by Luis Felipe Ybarra. It premiered on Azteca 7 on March 14 and ended on July 7, 2022.

Premise 
Rutas de la vida deals with the stories that happen every day in public transport in general, which, both the driver and the passenger a minute before boarding or getting off the transport, at a red light, due to twists of fate it can change their lives.

Cast 
  as Patricio
 Julio Casado as Mateo
 Ignacio Riva Palacio as Aurelio
 Simone Victoria as Doña Socorro
 David Ponce as El Mojarra
 Mario Alberto Monroy as El Sayayin
 Itari Marta as Ludivina
 Ricardo Reynaud as Armando
 Magalli Boysselle as Gloria
 Fabiana Perzabal as detective Fernández
 Laura de Ita as Chole
 Maribel Fernández as Pelacho
 Carlos Millet as Clodomiro
  as Nurse
  as Héctor
 Guillermo Nava as Charlie
 Alejandro Durán as Joel
 Claudia Arce as Alba
 Carla Carrillo as Belinda
  a Renzo Salgado
 Bárbara Falconi as Gloria
 Vanessa Acosta as Dana
 Rodolfo Valdés as Gabriel
 Luis Yeverino as Daniel
 Mariana Ávila as Natalia
 Emmanuel Okaury as Daniel
 Susana Diazayas as Alejandra
 Adrián Rubio as Ulises
 Tomás Goros as Aliosán
 Fran Meric as Tonatzin / Soraya
 Alejandra Lazcano as América
 Pilar Ixquic Mata as Doña Fabiana
 Mayra Rojas as Concha
  as Braulio
 María Fernanda García as Melissa
 Diana Quijano as Vanesa
 Anabel Ferreira as Chief Nun
 Tania Niebla as Bichota
 Marco Treviño as Eufra
 Lorena del Castillo as Valeria
 Iker García as Adrián
  as El Aguaslocas
 Mayra Sierra as Diana
 Renata Manterola as Sabrina

Production 
Was announced in January 2021 by TV Azteca, being originally presented as part of the new Azteca 7's original programming in 2021. The production began filming on November 4, 2021 at a location in Mexico City, while filming in The forum began at the beginning of January 2022 in the Azteca Estudios forums. The series is directed by Mauricio Meneses and Gerardo Gómez, accompanied by a team of writers made up of Alejandra Urdiain, José Ramón Méndez and Natalia Núñez Silvestri, with a total of 60 episodes produced.

Ratings

References

External links 
 
 

2022 Mexican television series debuts
2022 Mexican television series endings
Azteca 7 original programming
Mexican anthology television series
Mexican drama television series
2020s Mexican drama television series
Television series by TV Azteca
Mexican LGBT-related television shows